El Hoceïma is a province in the region of Tanger-Tetouan-Al Hoceima, Morocco. Its population in 2004 was 395,644. 

The major cities and towns are: 
 Ait Kamra
 Ajdir
 Al Hoceima
 Bni Bouayach
 Bni Boufrah
 Bni Hadifa
 Imzouren
 Issaguen
 Tamassint
 Targuist

Subdivisions
The province is divided administratively into the following:

References

 
Al Hoceïma